Anoteropsis forsteri is a species of wolf spider that is endemic to New Zealand.

Etymology 
The species is named after the arachnologist Raymond Forster, who mentored the describer of this species.

Taxonomy 
Anoteropsis forsteri was described in 2002.

Description 
Anoteropsis forsteri is very similar to A. litoralis which occupies similar habitat, but can be distinguished by morphological features of their reproductive organs.

Habitat and distribution 
Anoteropsis forsteri occupies sand dunes and beaches, where their colouration allows them to camouflage into the background very easily. They can be found in these habitats south of 44°S in New Zealand (Many habitats to the north are typically occupied by A. litoralis, a similar species).

References 

Lycosidae
Spiders described in 2002
Endemic spiders of New Zealand